Babcock & Wilcox is an American energy technology and service provider that is active and has operations in many international markets across the globe with its headquarters in Akron, Ohio, USA. Historically, the company is best known for their steam boilers.

Background
The company was founded in 1867 in Providence, Rhode Island, by partners Stephen Wilcox and George Babcock to manufacture and market Wilcox's patented water-tube boiler.

History

The company was founded in 1867 by Stephen Wilcox and his partner George Herman Babcock with the intention of building safer steam boilers. Stephen Wilcox first avowed that “there must be a better way” to safely generate power, and he and George Babcock responded with the design for the first inherently safe water-tube boiler. B&W was the main builder of naval boilers for American forces during World War II, and were a supplier to the Manhattan Project. After the war they entered the nuclear reactor business, and became a major supplier for commercial nuclear power plants. They also built naval nuclear reactors, including for the first commercial nuclear ship. In 2000 the company filed for bankruptcy due to lawsuits from employees over asbestos exposure; they emerged from bankruptcy in 2006.

 In 1867, Providence, Rhode Island, residents Stephen Wilcox and his partner George Herman Babcock patented the Babcock & Wilcox Non-Explosive Boiler, which used water filled tubes and de-nucleate boiling to generate steam more safely than either under-fire or fire-tube boilers.  The boilers more safely generated higher pressure steam and was more efficient (as an energy to steam converter) than existing designs.
In 1878, Thomas Edison purchased B&W boiler No. 92 for his Menlo Park laboratory.
 In 1891, Babcock & Wilcox Ltd is established as a separate United Kingdom company, to be responsible for all sales outside the US and Cuba.
 In 1895, Supply of steam furnaces of Kahrizak sugar factory, Tehran, Iran 
 In 1898, Robert Jurenka and Alois Seidl signed an agreement with the British division of Babcock & Wilcox Ltd to make the Berlin, Germany Babcock sales office into a subsidiary of the British company; a factory in Oberhausen in the Ruhr district made the boiler designed by the American engineers.
 In 1902, the New York City's first subway is powered by B&W boilers.
 During 1907 and 1909 Theodore Roosevelt's Great White Fleet were powered by B&W Boilers.
 In 1923, both Babcock & Wilcox Ltd and The Babcock & Wilcox Company buy into The Goldie & McCulloch Company Ltd of Cambridge, Ontario, to form Babcock-Wilcox & Goldie-McCulloch Ltd in Canada.
 In 1929, B&W installs the world's first commercial size recovery boiler using the magnesium bisulfite process in Quebec, Canada.
 Between 1941 and 1945 B&W designed and delivered 4,100 marine boilers for combat and merchant ships, including 95 percent of the US fleet in Tokyo Bay at Japanese surrender.
 In 1942, the company developed the cyclone furnace.
 Between 1943 and 1945, B&W provided components, materials and process development for Manhattan Project.
 In 1948, Babcock and Wilcox was at the center of a labor dispute with the United Stone and Allied Products Workers of America. The National Labor Relations Board held that during captive audience meetings, the union was entitled to equal time. This was later overturned in Livingston Shirt Corp.
 In 1961, B&W designed and supplied reactors for world's first commercial nuclear ship .
 In 1962, B&W designed and furnished reactor systems for B&W's first commercial reactor, Indian Point, using HEU 233.
 In 1967, the name of Babcock-Wilcox & Goldie-McCulloch Ltd is changed to Babcock & Wilcox Canada Ltd.
 In 1975, B&W designed and built components for liquid metal fast breeder reactors.
 In 1975, the long-term business agreements with the British Babcock & Wilcox Ltd were ended. Subsequently, the British company was renamed Babcock International Group plc.
 In 1978, B&W designed and built the nuclear reactor that was involved in the Three Mile Island accident.
 In 1999, B&W was awarded the contract to develop fuel cells and steam reforming for US Navy.
 On February 22, 2000, B&W filed for Chapter 11 bankruptcy in part as a result of thousands of claims for personal injury due to prolonged exposure to asbestos and asbestos fibers. Claims included asbestosis, lung cancer, pleural and peritoneal mesothelioma. As a condition of emerging from bankruptcy, B&W created a trust fund to compensate victims for amounts far less than settlements paid in individual personal injury lawsuits.
 After B&W emerged from bankruptcy in 2006, B&W and BWX Technologies, both subsidiaries of the McDermott International, Inc., merged on 26 November 2007 to form The Babcock & Wilcox Companies, headed by President John Fees. The old company logo was changed.
On June 10, 2009, B&W unveiled B&W Modular Nuclear Energy, LLC (B&W MNE). On the same day, B&W MNE announced its plans to design and develop the B&W mPower reactor, a modular, scalable nuclear reactor. The B&W mPower reactor design is a 125 megawatt, passively safe Advanced Light Water Reactor (ALWR) (a Generation III reactor) with a below-ground containment structure. The reactor is set to be manufactured in a factory, shipped by rail, then buried underground.
 On May 12, 2010, B&W announced that it and its subsidiaries would be spun off from its parent company, McDermott International, Inc. The headquarters moved from Lynchburg, Virginia to Charlotte. and the company became The Babcock & Wilcox Company.
 On August 2, 2010, B&W began trading on the New York Stock Exchange as BWC.
 On June 30, 2015, Babcock & Wilcox completed a spinoff from BWX Technologies, its former parent company. The two companies began trading separately on July 1 when Babcock & Wilcox Enterprises, Inc. was listed on the New York Stock Exchange under the ticker symbol: BW.
On September 24, 2018, Babcock & Wilcox announced that it would move its corporate headquarters from Charlotte to Akron, Ohio, into space formerly occupied by the Goodyear Tire and Rubber Company prior to its move to a new building nearby.
On December 30, 2019, Babcock & Wilcox relocated its corporate headquarters from Barberton, Ohio, to Akron, Ohio.

Football

The company had works association football teams which played at senior level in Scotland and the United States; Babcock & Wilcox F.C. reached the second round of the Scottish Cup on two occasions, and the American side was runner-up once in the American Cup.

See also
 Steam generator (boiler)

References

External links

 
 
 

Manufacturing companies based in Ohio
Manufacturing companies established in 1867
Companies listed on the New York Stock Exchange
Nuclear technology companies of the United States
Companies based in Akron, Ohio
American companies established in 1867
1867 establishments in Rhode Island
Companies that filed for Chapter 11 bankruptcy in 2000
Electrical engineering companies of the United States